Turgeon is a surname. Notable people with the surname include:

Athletics
Frédérique Turgeon (born 1999), Canadian para-alpine skier
Mélanie Turgeon (born 1976), Canadian skier
Mark Turgeon (born 1965), college basketball coach
Mathieu Turgeon (born 1979), Canadian trampoline gymnast
Pete Turgeon (1897-1977), baseball player
Pierre Turgeon (born 1969), ice hockey player
Sylvain Turgeon (born 1965), ice hockey player

Politics
Abraham Turgeon (1783-1851), notary and political figure in Canada East
Adélard Turgeon (1863-1930), Canadian lawyer and politician
James Gray Turgeon (1879-1964), broker, soldier and a provincial and federal level politician from Canada
J. B. Turgeon (1810-1897), the first French-Canadian mayor of Bytown, Canada
Joseph Turgeon (1751-1831), master carpenter and political figure in Lower Canada
Joseph-Ovide Turgeon (1797-1856), Quebec official and political figure
Louis Turgeon (1762-1827), notary, seigneur and political figure in Lower Canada
Onésiphore Turgeon (1849-1944), Canadian parliamentarian
William Ferdinand Alphonse Turgeon (1877-1969), Canadian politician, judge, and diplomat

Other
Charlotte Turgeon (1912-2009), American chef and author
Dai Turgeon, Canadian stage actress
Frances Turgeon Wiggin (1891-1985), American author and composer
Marie-Élisabeth Turgeon (1840-1881), Canadian Roman Catholic religious sister and Blessed
Pierre Turgeon (born 1947), a Canadian novelist and essayist
Pierre-Flavien Turgeon (1787-1867), Canadian Roman Catholic priest and Archbishop of Quebec
Serge Turgeon (1946-2004), Quebec actor and union leader

See also